CS Recordings  is an American record label founded in 2011 by electronic music producer DJ Trevi. CS Recordings is an independent label with music-rights and publishing at BMI.

Signed artists

Current 

 DJ Trevi (founder)
 Mike Avery
 Hate Beat Crushers 
 Shmitty  
 Tyler Rouse
 Wardogg
 Tiffany Jackson
 J.A. Maldonado

Former 
  Alegroe
  Delshed
  Kash
 Haythem Hadhiri
 Dani DiMaggio

Releases
Albums, EPs, and singles from DJ Trevi's discography are included.

Standard releases

References

External links 
 

American record labels
Electronic music record labels
Record labels established in 2011
Electronic dance music record labels